The Industry and Exports (Financial Support) Act 2009 (c 5) is an Act of the Parliament of the United Kingdom. It was enacted in response to the "global downturn".

Section 1 - Increase in limit on selective financial assistance for industry

Section 1(1) substituted section 8(5) of the Industrial Development Act 1982.

Section 1(2) repealed the Industrial Development (Financial Assistance) Act 2003.

Section 2 - Assistance in connection with exports of goods or services

Section 2(1) substituted, for section 1(1) of the Export and Investment Guarantees Act 1991, new subsections (1) and (1A).

Section 2(2) provides that the power conferred by section 1(1) of that Act, as substituted, includes a power to make arrangements in connection with goods or services supplied before the commencement of section 2 of this Act.

Section 3
Section 3(2) provides that this Act came into force on the day on which it was passed (that is to say, received royal assent). This means that it came into force at the beginning of 21 May 2009.

Section 3(3) authorises the citation of this Act by a short title.

References
Halsbury's Statutes,

External links
The Industry and Exports (Financial Support) Act 2009, as amended from the National Archives.
The Industry and Exports (Financial Support) Act 2009, as originally enacted from the National Archives.
Explanatory notes to the Industry and Exports (Financial Support) Act 2009.

United Kingdom Acts of Parliament 2009